Parsec is a proprietary desktop capturing application primarily used for playing games through video streaming. Using Parsec, a user can stream video game footage through an Internet connection, allowing one to run a game on one computer but play it remotely through another device. Although its main focus is gaming, Parsec can also be used as low-latency desktop sharing software. The Parsec client is available on most modern operating systems including Windows, macOS, Android, Raspberry Pi 3 and Linux.

Parsec also provides a paid "Parsec for Teams" version with additional features for artists and developers, such as additional administrative tools, better color accuracy and the ability to stream multiple screens at once.

Parsec Warp adds additional settings, visual enhancements and more controls. The 4:4:4 mode makes colors sharper and crisper. Pen and tablet support has been added as well as the option to have extra displays.

Partnerships
Parsec previously provided a simple user interface for provisioning and connecting to pre-configured virtual machines hosted by Amazon Web Services and Paperspace, this has however been removed and is no longer part of the current version. In January 2018, Parsec partnered with Hewlett-Packard to create OMEN Game Stream, a free game streaming service based on Parsec's technology designed specifically for HP Omen PCs.

Unity plans to incorporate Parsec's software into the Unity engine to support development. Unity Technologies integrated Parsec at the beginning of 2022, making Parsec a part of Unity.

References

External links

Remote desktop